The year 2023 is the 13th year in the history of the ONE Championship, a mixed martial arts, kickboxing, Muay Thai and submission grappling promotion based in Singapore.

Events list

Scheduled events

Past events

Title fights

ONE Openweight Muay Thai World Grand Prix Tournament
On January 11, 2023, at ONE Fight Night 6 Press Conference in Bangkok, president and CEO Chatri Sityodtong announced plans for a 16-man grand prix that will pay the winner $1.5 million. All comers will be welcome, too, as the tournament will be open weight. But Chatri did not reveal additional details, such as when the grand prix will launch or how seeding will be determined. He promises it will be something special and that he intends to embrace the open weight format. You're going to see big guys against small guys, and Chatri did not reveal the line-up for the tournament, but named Rodtang Jitmuangnon, Superbon Singha Mawynn, Jonathan Haggerty and Liam Harrison. On January 22, 2023, it was announced his Sinsamut Klinmee be the first fighter to participate in the tournament.

See also
 List of current ONE fighters
 2023 in UFC
 2023 in Bellator MMA
 2023 in Absolute Championship Akhmat
 2023 in Konfrontacja Sztuk Walki
 2023 in Rizin Fighting Federation
 2023 in Brave Combat Federation
 2023 in Legacy Fighting Alliance
 2023 in Glory
 2023 in K-1 
 2023 in Romanian kickboxing
 2023 in Wu Lin Feng

References

External links
ONE Championship

ONE Championship events
ONE Championship events
2023 sport-related lists
ONE
ONE